Miroslav Kamenský (born 28 October 2001) is a Czech footballer who currently plays as a midfielder for FC Zbrojovka Brno.

Club career

FC Zbrojovka Brno
He made his professional debut for Zbrojovka Brno in the away match against Opava on 4 December 2021, which ended in a win 2:0. After 88 minutes he replaced Ota Kohoutek.

References

External links
 Profile at FC Zbrojovka Brno official site
 Profile at FAČR official site
 

2001 births
Living people
Czech footballers
FC Zbrojovka Brno players
Association football midfielders
Czech Republic youth international footballers
Footballers from Brno